Ruslan Solyanyk (born 8 August 1984, Poltava) is a professional Ukrainian football defender and midfielder who currently plays for the Ukrainian Second League side Kremin Kremenchuk. He spent the 2010 season playing for FC Zhetysu in the Kazakhstan Premier League. Prior to that, he played for Illychivets Mariupol in the Ukrainian Premier League where he moved from another UPL side Tavriya Simferopol before the start of the 2007–08 season.
 
On 25 January 2011, Solyanyk signed a 1.5-year contract with Chornomorets Odesa.

References

External links

Profile on Official Illychivets Website
Profile on Football Squads

1984 births
Living people
Ukrainian footballers
FC Mariupol players
FC Kryvbas Kryvyi Rih players
FC Vorskla Poltava players
SC Tavriya Simferopol players
FC Metalurh Donetsk players
FC Oleksandriya players
FC Chornomorets Odesa players
MFC Mykolaiv players
FC Kremin Kremenchuk players
Ukrainian Premier League players
Ukrainian expatriate footballers
Expatriate footballers in Kazakhstan
Association football defenders
Sportspeople from Poltava